= Briefings in Functional Genomics =

Scientific journal

- Discipline: Genomics
- Language: English
- Edited by: Paul Hurd

Publication details
- Former names: Briefings in Functional Genomics & Proteomics
- History: 2002
- Publisher: Oxford University Press
- Frequency: Bimonthly
- Impact factor: 4.241 (2020)

Standard abbreviations
- ISO 4: Brief. Funct. Genom.

Indexing
- ISSN: 2041-2649 (print); 2041-2657 (web)
- OCLC no.: 972053890

Links
- Journal homepage; Online access

Briefings in Functional Genomics is a bimonthly peer-reviewed scientific journal covering genomics. It was established in 2002 as Briefings in Functional Genomics & Proteomics, obtaining its current title in 2010. It is published by Oxford University Press and the editor-in-chief is Paul Hurd (Queen Mary University of London). According to the Journal Citation Reports, the journal has a 2020 impact factor of 4.241.

== Abstracting and indexing ==
The journal is abstracted and indexed in major bibliographic databases, including Science Citation Index Expanded, Journal Citation Reports, MEDLINE/PubMed, Scopus, EMBASE, BIOSIS Previews, and Current Contents/Life Sciences.
